Bouc-Bel-Air is a commune in the Bouches-du-Rhône department, Provence-Alpes-Côte d'Azur region in Southern France. It is situated between Aix-en-Provence to the north, Gardanne to the east, Marseille to the south and Vitrolles to the west. The old village is located at the summit of a small hill (a bouc in the regional language Provençal). In 2018, the commune had a population of 14,784.

Demographics

Sights
Bouc-Bel-Air is typically in Provençal style, founded around a rock which formed the foundation of an old castle of the 7th century. It has a particularly nice view of several mountains, including the  Sainte-Victoire.

History
Inhabited since very ancient times, its sites witness of Roman-Gallic settlings. Some of these sites date to the 7th century BC. Invasions of the Barbarians took place in the 7th century AD, the probable foundation date of the village. The mother of Adolphe Thiers, second President of France (31 August 1871 – 24 May 1873), was from Bouc-Bel-Air.

See also
Communes of the Bouches-du-Rhône department

References

External links

 Official website

Communes of Bouches-du-Rhône
Salyes
Bouches-du-Rhône communes articles needing translation from French Wikipedia